Paro United Football Club was a Bhutanese football club from Paro. The club played at the Woochu Sports Arena. They competed in the 2020 edition of the Bhutan Premier League.

The club was formed by Paro residents and the Thai-Bhutan society.

References

Football clubs in Bhutan
Paro District
Association football clubs established in 2015
2015 establishments in Bhutan